Christopher Paul Day  (born February 1960) is a British hepatologist who currently serves as Vice-Chancellor of Newcastle University.

Career
Educated at Marden High School, Tynemouth Sixth Form College and Churchill College, Cambridge, Day became a clinician at the Freeman Hospital in Newcastle upon Tyne in 1985 and a research scientist in liver disease at Newcastle University in 1987. He went on to be Consultant Hepatologist on the Liver Unit at the Freeman Hospital in 1994 before becoming Professor of Liver Medicine at Newcastle University in 2000. He became head of the School of Clinical Medical Sciences at Newcastle University in 2004, Pro-Vice-Chancellor in 2007 and Vice-Chancellor in January 2017.  He is also a Deputy Lieutenant of Tyne and Wear.

Day was appointed Commander of the Order of the British Empire (CBE) in the 2023 New Year Honours for services to health research and treatment.

References

Vice-Chancellors of Newcastle University
Living people
Alumni of Churchill College, Cambridge
Commanders of the Order of the British Empire
NIHR Senior Investigators
Deputy Lieutenants of Tyne and Wear
1960 births
21st-century British medical doctors
20th-century British medical doctors
British hepatologists